Charles Harold "Dutch" McCallister (October 14, 1903 – October 22, 1997) was an American water polo player who competed in the 1932 Summer Olympics and in the 1936 Summer Olympics.

He was born in Madison, South Dakota and died in Los Angeles, California.

In 1932 he was part of the American team which won the bronze medal. He played all four matches.

Four years later at the 1936 Summer Olympics he was a member of the American team which was eliminated in the first round of the 1936 tournament. He played all three matches.

In 1980, he was inducted into the USA Water Polo Hall of Fame.

See also
 List of Olympic medalists in water polo (men)

References

External links
 
 Interview 1988 by George Hodak

1903 births
1997 deaths
American male water polo players
Water polo players at the 1932 Summer Olympics
Water polo players at the 1936 Summer Olympics
Olympic bronze medalists for the United States in water polo
Medalists at the 1932 Summer Olympics
People from Madison, South Dakota
Long Beach Polytechnic High School alumni